N'Gorkou  is a village and rural commune of the Cercle of Niafunké in the Tombouctou Region of Mali. The commune includes around 54 small settlements.

Notes

External links
.

Communes of Tombouctou Region